Amritavarshini Vav, also known as Panchkuva Stepwell or Katkhuni Vav, is a stepwell near the Panchkuva Darwaja in Ahmedabad, Gujarat, India.

History
Panchkuva, literally five wells, area derived its name the five wells in the area. Amritavarshini vav was completed in 1723 as per Devanagari and Persian inscription ( Vikram Samvat 1779/A.H. 1135 ) in the stepwell. It was built by Raghunathdas, diwan to Haidar Quli Khan, who was the governor of Gujarat during his stay in the city in 1721–1722 for charitable purpose.

Architecture
Sparsely ornamented, Amriavarshini Vav is notable for its L-shaped plan and has simple design. It has three storeys and is more than 50 feet deep. The bracing arches have different shapes at the two storeys and in the kuta (pavilion tower) before the well shaft. It was declared a protected monument in 1969 and was conserved in 1999. It was recharged later by digging in 2004.

Gallery

See also

 Adalaj Stepwell
 Dada Harir Stepwell
 Mata Bhavani's Stepwell
 Jethabhai's Stepwell
 Ahmedabad

References

Stepwells in Gujarat
Buildings and structures in Ahmedabad
Tourist attractions in Ahmedabad